In 1955 the British Lions rugby union team toured Southern and Eastern Africa. The Lions drew the test series against , each team winning two of the four matches. They won the first test by a single point and the third by three points and lost the second and fourth matches by wider margins. As well as South Africa, the tour included a match against South West Africa (later to become ), two games against Rhodesia (later to become Zimbabwe) and one versus East Africa.

Overall the tourists played twenty-five matches winning nineteen, losing five and drawing one. The Lions lost their opening fixture against Western Transvaal and were also beaten by Eastern Province and Border later in the tour. They drew with Eastern Transvaal.

It was the Lions' second tour after World War II and the first to South Africa after that war.

The touring party was captained by Robin Thompson of Ireland. The manager was Jack A. E. Siggins and the assistant manager was D. E. Davies.

Jack Siggins had the honour of being invited, by the Rugby Football Union of East Africa (RFUEA), officially to open the newly constructed RFUEA Ground at Ngong Road in Nairobi just prior to the Lions last match of that tour against East Africa.

Squad

Management 
 Manager: J. A. E. Siggins
 Assistant Manager: D. E. Davies

Backs 
Doug Baker (Old Merchant Taylors and )
Jeff Butterfield (Northampton and )
Angus Cameron (Glasgow HSFP and )
Phil Davies (Harlequins and )
Gareth Griffiths (Cardiff and )
Dickie Jeeps (Northampton) 
Trevor Lloyd (Maesteg and )
Cliff Morgan (Cardiff and )
Haydn Morris (Cardiff and )
Tony O'Reilly (Old Belvedere and )
Cecil Pedlow (Queen's University RFC and )
Pat Quinn (New Brighton and )
Arthur Smith (Cambridge University and )
Frank Sykes (Northampton and )
Alun Thomas (Llanelli and )
Johnny Williams (Old Millhillians and )

Forwards 
Tom Elliot (Gala and )
Jim Greenwood (Dunfermline and )
Reg Higgins (Liverpool and )
Hugh McLeod (Hawick and )
Bryn Meredith (Newport and )
Courtney Meredith (Neath and )
Ernie Michie (Aberdeen University and )
Tom Reid (Garryowen and )
Russell Robins (Pontypridd and )
Robin Roe (Lansdowne and )
Clem Thomas (Swansea and )
Robin Thompson (Instonians and ) (Captain)
Rhys Williams (Llanelli and )
Billy Williams (Swansea and )
Dyson Wilson (Metropolitan Police and )

 Dickie Jeeps later played for England but was uncapped at the time of the 1955 tour.

The Idi Amin myth 
There is a frequently repeated urban legend that Idi Amin (later to become the infamous military dictator of Uganda) was selected as a replacement by East Africa for their match against the 1955 British Lions.  The story is entirely unfounded, he does not appear on the team photograph or on the official team list and replacements were not allowed in international rugby until 13 years after this event is supposed to have taken place.

Results 
Scores and results list Lions' points tally first.

Bibliography

Notes 

British Lions tour
British & Irish Lions tours of South Africa
Rugby union tours of Kenya
Rugby union tours of Namibia
Rugby union tours of Zimbabwe
1955 in South African rugby union
1954–55 in British rugby union
1954–55 in Irish rugby union